Netherlands competed at the 2015 World Aquatics Championships in Kazan, Russia from 24 July to 9 August 2015.

Medalists

Diving

Dutch divers qualified for the individual spots and the synchronized teams at the World Championships.

Women

Open water swimming

Netherlands fielded a full team of three swimmers to compete in the open water marathon.

Swimming

Dutch swimmers have achieved qualifying standards in the following events (up to a maximum of 2 swimmers in each event at the A-standard entry time, and 1 at the B-standard): Swimmers must qualify at the 2015 KNZB Challenge Cup in Alkmaar (for pool events) to confirm their places for the Worlds.

The Dutch team nominated fifteen swimmers (six men and nine women) to compete at the Worlds, including two-time Olympic champion Ranomi Kromowidjojo in the sprint freestyle events (50 and 100 m).

Men

Women

Mixed

Water polo

Women's tournament

Team roster

Laura Aarts
Miloushka Smit
Dagmar Genee
Sabrina van der Sloot
Amarens Genee
Nomi Stomphorst
Marloes Nijhuis
Vivian Sevenich
Maud Megens
Isabella van Toorn
Lieke Klaassen
Leonie van der Molen
Debby Willemsz

Group play

Playoffs

Quarterfinals

Semifinals

Final

References

External links
Royal Dutch Swimming Federation 

Nations at the 2015 World Aquatics Championships
2015 in Dutch sport
Netherlands at the World Aquatics Championships